Lawndale may refer to these places in the U.S. state of Michigan:

 Lawndale, Kalamazoo County, Michigan in Comstock Township
 Lawndale, Saginaw County, Michigan in Saginaw Charter Township

See also
 West Vernor-Lawndale Historic District in Detroit, Michigan
 Lawndale (disambiguation)